Flymore are a Russian nu metal band from Ivanovo that were formed in 2002.

History
The band was formed in 2002 in Ivanovo, Russia after the split of another band, Millenium. It was founded by guitarist Igor "Fly" Muchin and vocalist Max "Frozt" Morozov. In 2009, they released their first studio album entitled "Millenium IV V," which was recorded on the label Right Recordings. One of the songs ("All The Time I Bled") was shot with a music video. On February 26, 2013, the band released an EP called "Mind Tricks".

Style
The band has been described as playing nu metal with elements of industrial metal, and have been accused of sounding very similar to Korn.

Discography

Studio albums
 Millenium IV V (2009)

EPs
 Mind Tricks (2013)

Members

Current
Max "Frozt" Morozov – vocals (2002–)
Igor "Fly" Muchin – guitar (2002–)
Paul "Rage" Jones – bass guitar (2013–)
Gustaf "ThorBo" Bodén – drums (2013–)
Jonas "STORM" Blomqvist – guitar (2013–)

Former
Denis "Chek" Rybakov – bass guitar (2002–2013)
Nikita Alekseev – guitar (2006–2013)
Serj Yashin – drums (2011–2013)
Serj Kulikov – drums (2005–2011)
Dmitriy Kurin – drums (2002–2005)

References

Musical groups established in 2002
Russian nu metal musical groups